Andreé González, full name Andreé Aníbal González Frustacci (nicknamed Varilla) (born June 30, 1975), is a Venezuelan footballer who is currently free agent.

International career
González has won 17 caps for the Venezuela national football team.

In 2004, he played the Copa América.

References

External links
 
 Statistics at LFP.es
 Profile at soccerway

1975 births
Living people
Venezuelan footballers
Venezuela international footballers
Peñarol players
Liverpool F.C. (Montevideo) players
Caracas FC players
Recreativo de Huelva players
Centro Atlético Fénix players
Defensor Sporting players
UA Maracaibo players
Club Atlético River Plate (Montevideo) players
Monagas S.C. players
Sportivo Cerrito players
Zulia F.C. players
Uruguayan Primera División players
Segunda División players
2004 Copa América players
Venezuelan expatriate footballers
Venezuelan expatriate sportspeople in Uruguay
Venezuelan expatriate sportspeople in Spain
Expatriate footballers in Uruguay
Expatriate footballers in Spain
Association football defenders
People from San Cristóbal, Táchira